Mikhail Ivanovich Nichepurenko (born 27 December 1955 in Novokuybyshevsk, Kuybyshev Oblast) is a retired field hockey player from Russia, who won the bronze medal with the Men's National Field Hockey Team from the Soviet Union at the boycotted 1980 Summer Olympics in Moscow.

References
sports-reference

External links
 

1955 births
Living people
Russian male field hockey players
Olympic field hockey players of the Soviet Union
Soviet male field hockey players
Field hockey players at the 1980 Summer Olympics
Field hockey players at the 1988 Summer Olympics
Olympic bronze medalists for the Soviet Union
Olympic medalists in field hockey
People from Novokuybyshevsk
Medalists at the 1980 Summer Olympics
Sportspeople from Samara Oblast